Prospect is an electoral district of the Legislative Assembly in the Australian state of New South Wales. An urban electorate in western Sydney, it is centred on the suburb of Prospect from which it takes its name. It also includes the suburbs of Arndell Park, Bossley Park, Bungarribee, Girraween, Huntingwood, Pemulwuy, Prairiewood, Wetherill Park, as well as parts of Blacktown, Eastern Creek, Greystanes, Pendle Hill and Smithfield.

Prospect is represented by Hugh McDermott of the Labor Party.

Prospect was created as a result of the 2013 redistribution and largely replaced the abolished electorate of Smithfield.

Members for Prospect

Election results

References

Prospect
2015 establishments in Australia
Prospect